The Băișoara mine is a large open pit mine in the north-western of Romania in Cluj County, 60 km south of Cluj-Napoca and 466 km north-west of the capital, Bucharest. Băișoara represents one of the largest iron ore reserves in Romania having estimated reserves of 6 million tonnes of ore. The mine produces around 50,000 tonnes of iron ore/year.

References 

Iron mines in Romania